William John Brennan (16 February 1938 – 31 August 2013) was an Australian Roman Catholic bishop.

Ordained to the priesthood in 1960, Brennan was named the fourth bishop of the Roman Catholic Diocese of Wagga Wagga, Australia in 1984. Brennan resigned in 2002 due to illness.

On 31 August 2013, Brennan, at the age of 75, died at Little Sisters of the Poor Nursing Home in Randwick, New South Wales. His funeral service was held in St Michael's Cathedral, Wagga Wagga and he was interred in the crypt.

Notes

1938 births
2013 deaths
20th-century Roman Catholic bishops in Australia
Roman Catholic bishops of Wagga Wagga